Saint-Marc-de-Figuery is a parish municipality in the Canadian province of Quebec, located in the Abitibi Regional County Municipality. It is part of the census agglomeration of Amos.

Demographics 

Population trend:
 Population in 2016: 834 (2011 to 2016 population change: 8.2%)
 Population in 2011: 771 (2006 to 2011 population change: 11.4%)
 Population in 2006: 692
 Population in 2001: 615
 Population in 1996: 580
 Population in 1991: 584

Mother tongues spoken are:
 English as first language: 0%
 French as first language: 100%
 English and French as first language: 0%
 Other as first language: 0%

Municipal council
 Mayor: Jacques Riopel
 Councillors: Mario Collin, Alain Dubois, Diane Laverdière, Thérèse Lemay, Réal Nolet, Jean-Jacques Trépanier

References

Parish municipalities in Quebec
Incorporated places in Abitibi-Témiscamingue